Morgan Girls High School (also referred to as MGHS), is a public school in D.I.T., Narayanganj, Bangladesh. The school offers education for students ranging from third grade to tenth grade (approximately ages 8 to 16). With over 1,200 students, Morgan Girls High School is one of the largest girls schools in Narayanganj district.

Morgan Girls High School is recognized for its academic performance having produced many notable alumni including leaders in scientists, engineers, doctors, business, teachers, national politics, the military and as well as senior government officers. The Government of Bangladesh noted the school for its tremendous performance in the Secondary School Certificate examinations in recent years.

History

Morgan Girls High School was established in 1910, in an area of about 5 acre beside Bhasha Sainik Mamataj Begum Road near Ali Ahmed Municipality Library in Narayanganj. The primary school, and later the primary school, were modeled after public schools in the Bangladesh Government (according to the Bangladesh Government Public Schools Act 1968). Since its inception, the school has been funded through government grants and fees from students. The Board of Governors has been empowered to “frame rules as it deems necessary for the proper functioning of the school”.

Mumtaz Begum became headmistress in 1951. She led students in protests as part of the Bengali language movement. In an effort to squelch the protests, she was arrested in February 1952 on trumped-up charges of embezzlement from the school, and was kept in jail until May 1953. In 2012, she was posthumously awarded the Ekushey Padak, the second highest civilian award in Bangladesh, for her role in the movement.

The school began with only one study session, known as the Morning shift which operates from 8:00 a.m. to 12:45 p.m. In March 1993, another session known as the Day shift was added, according to the education expansion policy of the government, to cope with the growing number of students. The day shift session operates from 11:00 p.m. to 4:00 p.m.

Campus
Morgan Girls High School is located in northwest Narayanganj at Bhasha Sainik Mamataj Begum Road, just opposite the D.I.T. super market. With 4 buildings (including the newly built building), it is one of the largest school in Narayanganj district. The campus consists of a main building, a staff quarter, an auditorium, an administrative building and a full-size football field. Two buildings known as Academic Buildings are used for academic purposes. Academic Building 1, for ninth grade through to twelfth grade, is located at the northeast side; Academic Building 2, for third grade through to the eighth grade, is located at southeast corner of the campus. A monument has been built in front of Academic Building 1 to commemorate those killed during the Bengali Language Movement demonstrations of 1952. The Language Movement was a political effort in East Pakistan, advocating the recognition of the Bengali language as an official language of Pakistan.

Academics
Morgan Girls High School offers both primary and secondary education and emphasizes student discipline in all of their activities. It has laboratories for physics, chemistry, computers, biology, mathematics and geography and a library with more than 2,000 books, journals, newspapers and magazines. The academic year is divided into three terms. In addition to a terminal exam, two class tests are held each term. Students have to sit for the Secondary School Certificate (S.S.C.) examination at the end of the 10th grade.

At the completion of the 5th grade, students qualify for a primary scholarship program through another examination. Students at the end of the 8th grade have to sit for a public examination known as Junior School Certificate and then the option to sit for the junior scholarship examination. The school employs about 55 teaching staff and 12 non-teaching staff. The student-teacher ratio is 40:1. Teachers occasionally attend training programs organized by different government institutions. The school had more training workshops for its teachers than any other neighboring cluster of schools in 2000, under the English Language Teaching Improvement Project, which is funded by the British and Bangladeshi governments.

The school operates on two different schedules. Students can opt for either of the schedules right before their enrollment. Each schedule includes seven periods and a 40-minute break for lunch. Students are provided with snacks by the school. The school is a closed campus; students are not allowed to leave school grounds during school hours.

Admission
Although Morgan Girls High School operates from the third through the tenth grade, it only admits students into the third, sixth and ninth grades. Consequently, the higher grades have fewer students than the lower grades, as a relatively large number of students transfer out. Admission in the 3rd and 9th grades are based on admission tests. Students who pass the written test have to qualify in the viva exam.

Uniform
The uniform for students from grades third to tenth consists of a short-sleeved white shirt with green skirts. The uniform differs a bit during the winter season. In winter, students wear a green blue sweater with addition to shirts. For footwear, students wear white shoes with white socks. Besides, a school badge is included as part of the uniform.

Curriculum
The curriculum of Morgan Girls High School includes traditional primary and secondary level academic subjects. Students of primary classes (third to fifth grade) take academic core subjects including Bengali, mathematics, English, social science, general science, religion, arts and crafts, and physical science. After completing their primary education students have to take home economics.
Students of the secondary (sixth to tenth grade) level have to elect one of the three major programs: Science, Arts and Humanities and Commerce.

Academic performance
The S.S.C. examination is conducted by the Board of Secondary and Intermediate Education under the Ministry of Education. The S.S.C. examination consists of eleven subjects totaling 1,100 marks, with each subject given 100 marks, including practical exams for science subjects. To pass each subject a minimum of 33 marks are required. Courses will depend on which major program a student has elected to study. These major programs are Science, Arts and Humanities, and Commerce. Students elect one of these three programs just before enrollment in the ninth grade for S.S.C. examination.
The highest score is GPA-5. The Dhaka Education Board annually ranks schools and colleges from across the country in terms of GPA (Grade Point Average) is 5 scorers.

Extracurricular activities
Students of Morgan Girls High School participate in different programs and contests like debating, arts, music, sports, athletics, essay writing, quizzes, science fairs and other extracurricular activities at both national and international levels. They also participate in math, chemistry, physics and astronomy Olympiads. For extracurricular activities the school has debating, science and culture clubs. It also has a Girls Scout troop.

Sports
Sports are a major feature of Morgan Girls High School. Among the indoor games, volleyball and basketball are the most popular. The school has teams for volleyball, basketball, table tennis and chess that participate in national and regional games. The team won the championship in the Inter School Girls Basketball Competition in 2000. The school also hosts many tournaments on its grounds.

Debate
Debating is one of the major extracurricular activities of Morgan Girls High School. The school has a team for debating club which represents the school in various regional and national level debating contests.

Other activities
Apart from debates and sports, students of Morgan Girls High School also participate in many other extracurricular activities such as Science Olympiads, Mathematical Olympiads, Astronomy Olympiads Informatics Olympiads and science fairs.

Publications
Morgan Girls High School annually publishes a magazine titled X, which contains school related news, articles, stories, poems, science fiction, humors and other items of interest, written by the students, teachers and staffs. The magazine reflects the creativity of the school and provides an opportunity for students to express their thoughts.

Alumni association
Morgan Girls High School Alumni Association

References

External links

 Community Page

High schools in Bangladesh
Educational institutions established in 1970
Education in Narayanganj